is a Japanese politician and current member of the House of Councillors. He and fellow councillor Eiko Kimura became the first people with severe disabilities elected to Japan's National Diet in 2019. He is a member of the Reiwa Shinsengumi.

ALS has caused him to lose much of his mobility, requiring a full-time caregiver.

Early life 
Funago was born in Gifu City, Gifu Prefecture. He moved to Chiba City, Chiba Prefecture when he was 10 years old and attended Chiba Minami Prefectural High School. After graduating high school, he studied under the Faculty of Political Science and Economics at Takushoku University.

Although he originally wanted to become a professional musician, Funago became an employee of Sakata Watch Trading Co., Ltd. after graduating university in 1982. A few years later, at the age of 28, he married.

References

External links 
 

1957 births
Living people
Members of the House of Councillors (Japan)
Japanese politicians with disabilities
People with motor neuron disease
21st-century Japanese politicians
Politicians from Gifu Prefecture